Stony Point is a hamlet and census-designated place in the town of Stony Point, Rockland County, New York, United States. It is located north of West Haverstraw, east of Harriman State Park, south of Tomkins Cove, and west of the Hudson River. The population was 12,147 at the 2010 census.

The community is in the eastern part of the town of Stony Point.

Geography
Stony Point is located at  (41.226361, -73.99293).

Stony Point is home to Camp Bullowa, a  Boy Scout camp.

Demographics

As of the census of 2000, there were 11,744 people, 3,991 households, and 3,160 families residing in the CDP. The population density was 2,134.8 per square mile (824.4/km2). There were 4,074 housing units at an average density of 740.6/sq mi (286.0/km2). The racial makeup of the CDP was 94.25% White, 1.37% Black or African American, 0.14% Native American, 1.39% Asian, 0.03% Pacific Islander, 1.61% from other races, and 1.22% from two or more races. Hispanic or Latino of any race were 7.06% of the population.

There were 3,991 households, out of which 38.1% had children under the age of 18 living with them, 66.1% were married couples living together, 9.6% had a female householder with no husband present, and 20.8% were non-families. 17.4% of all households were made up of individuals, and 8.5% had someone living alone who was 65 years of age or older. The average household size was 2.91 and the average family size was 3.31.

In the CDP, the population was spread out, with 25.9% under the age of 18, 6.6% from 18 to 24, 30.2% from 25 to 44, 25.1% from 45 to 64, and 12.3% who were 65 years of age or older. The median age was 38 years. For every 100 females, there were 98.4 males. For every 100 females age 18 and over, there were 94.0 males.

The median income for a household in the CDP was $71,017, and the median income for a family was $82,124. Males had a median income of $55,014 versus $35,974 for females. The per capita income for the CDP was $27,975. About 1.9% of families and 3.6% of the population were below the poverty line, including 2.7% of those under age 18 and 10.3% of those age 65 or over.

References

External links
 Wayne Hose Company #1, volunteer fire department serving Stony Point
 Stony Point Police Department
 Camp Bullowa, Boy Scouts of America, Hudson Valley Council

Census-designated places in New York (state)
Hamlets in New York (state)
Census-designated places in Rockland County, New York
Hamlets in Rockland County, New York